The 1948–49 Sussex County Football League season was the 24th in the history of the competition.

League table
The league featured 14 clubs, 13 which competed in the last season, along with one new club:
 Lancing Athletic
Chichester added City to the club name.

League table

References

1948-49
9